Romas Kirveliavičius (born 5 March 1988) is a Lithuanian-born Austrian handball player for HBW Balingen-Weilstetten and the Austrian national team.

References

1988 births
Living people
Austrian male handball players
Lithuanian male handball players
People from Druskininkai
Naturalised citizens of Austria
Austrian people of Lithuanian descent
Expatriate handball players
Handball-Bundesliga players